Hristo (Slavov) Kyuchukov or Christo Slavov Kütchukov is a German Muslim Rom, born in Bulgaria (born 19 July 1962, Provadia). He is a leading specialist in the field of Romani language and education of Roma children in Europe.

Education
Prof. Kyuchukov holds a Ph.D. in General linguistics (Psycholinguistics) from the University of Amsterdam, the Netherlands (1995); Ph. D. in Education (1998) and DrSc in Theory of Education and Didactics (2002) from Bulgaria. His Habilitation is also in the field of Education from Bulgaria, and he holds the academic title "Professor of General Linguistics" (Psycholinguistics) with focus on Romani and Turkish languages from the Matej Bel University in Banska Bystrica, Slovakia.

Research
His research interests are in the field of bilingualism, education of Roma and Turkish children in Europe, language acquisition, psycholinguistics and sociolinguistics, languages in contact, Roma Holocaust and Antigypsyism in Europe. His linguistic research are on Romani, Balkan Turkish, Gagauz and Tatar languages in Bulgaria, on Bulgarian, Slovak, Russian and German languages. For his research he received fellowships from Swedish Institute - Stockholm, Amsterdam University, Pro Helvetia Foundation - Switzerland, Soros Foundation - New York, the Bulgarian Fulbright Commission, the Slovak government, the University of Silesia, Katowice, Poland, and "Amaro Drom" Foundation in Berlin.

Romani language
Kyuchukov introduced the Romani language education in Bulgaria to primary and secondary school children at the beginning of the 1990s, and he also introduced new University programs connected to Romani language education at University level: in Bulgaria (University of Veliko Tarnovo, 2003-2010), in Slovakia (Constantine the Philosopher University in Nitra, 2008-2012) and the St. Elizabeth University in Bratislava (2012-2015).

In 2006, he received a Fulbright scholarships and worked at the Laboratory of Psycholinguistics, at Smith College, MA, USA together with the American psycholinguist Prof. Dr. Jill de Villiers, developing the first Theory of Mind Tests in Romani language. Between  2006 and 2015 together with Jill de Villiers he developed also first Psycholinguistic Tests for Romani language assessment  and organised the first international research with Roma children in Romani, in many European countries.

Since 2010 he collaborates with Prof. Dr. William New, Beloit College, WI, USA doing research on Roma children educational issues in Europe.

In 2020 he was elected as High Commissioner of the Commission of Romani language, culture and education of the International Romani Union (IRU).

Turkish language 
In the field of Turkish linguistics, Kyuchukov has many research projects and publications on Balkanized Turkish, spoken by Turks and Muslim Roma in Bulgaria and other Balkan countries.

In 1992 he was involved in the first national experiment introducing Turkish language as a mother tongue in Bulgarian schools, organized by the Bulgarian Ministry of Education and he is the author of first experimental textbooks in Turkish language in Bulgaria, together with Prof. Dr. Miroslav Yanakiev 

He is one of the few experts in the world actively working on the acquisition of Balkanized Turkish by Turkish and  Muslim Roma children in Bulgaria.

In 2011, Hristo Kyuchukov introduced a new subjects in the M.A. Program of the Institute of Turkish Studies at the Free University of Berlin, Germany: "Turkish Dialects  of Muslim Roma from Balkan countries" and "Balkan Turkish Sociolinguistics".

Universities and research institutes
For last 30 years Prof. Kyuchukov worked at different European and American Universities and Research Institutes: the University of Shumen and the University of Veliko Tarnovo in Bulgaria; Constantine the Philosopher University in Nitra and St. Elizabeth University in Bratislava, Slovakia. He was a guest-professor at different European and American universities: University of San Francisco, CA, USA;  Beloit College, WI, USA;  Smith College, MA, USA;  Moscow  Pedagogical State University in Russia; Russian Academy of Sciences;  the Institute of Turkish Studies at Free University of Berlin and the Magdeburg-Stendal University of Applied Sciences in Germany; University of Silesia in Katowice, Poland; The Research Institute of Child Psychology and Pathopsychology, Bratislava,  Slovakia, New Bulgarian University in Sofia and Plovdiv University in Bulgaria. 

Since 2017, he is appointed as a full time Professor at the University of Silesia in Katowice, Poland, where he teaches social psychology, applied linguistics, educational methods to students from the Institute of Education.

In 2013, for his extraordinary work in the field of Roma Education and psycholinguistics research with Roma children in Europe, Kyuchukov received the title "Corresponding Member" and in 2014 the title "Academician"  of the International Teacher's Training Academy of Science (Международная Академия Наук Педагогического Образования - МАНПО) in Moscow, Russia.

Author
Author of number of scientific publications regarding Romani, Turkish, Gagauz, Bulgarian and Russian in contact; acquisition of Romani and Turkish; education of minority children in Europe, Kyuchukov also published many children's books in Romani and English,  but the most famous ones are: "A history of  the Romani People" (2005) written in co-authorship with Ian Hancock and "My name was Hussein" (2004) published by Boyds Mills Press, USA.He is author of number of children books in Romani, German, Turkish, Arabic, English and Bulgarian. 

In 1995 Prof. Kyuchukov established the "Diversity" Balkan Foundation for Cross-cultural education and understanding in Sofia, Bulgaria and between 1995 - 2007 he was its Executive Director. Under his supervision the Foundation realized more than 100 educational and linguistic projects. Between 1998-1999 he did work at the Institute of Educational Policy at Open Society Institute-Budapest and he was responsible for development of educational strategies for Roma and minority children education in Central and East European countries.

Between 2000 - 2004, Hristo Kyuchukov was the Secretary General of the International Romani Union (IRU).

In 2011, he established the "Roma Center for Intercultural Dialogue" in Berlin and he is its Director.

In 2018 together with Prof. Dr. Ian Hancock and Orhan Galjus he established the ERAN (Eurаsian Romani Academic Network) of scholars of Romani origin in Europe and Asia, and since then he acts as the Vice-President of the Network. In 2021 he established a European Young Roma Scholars Network (EYRSN) in Berlin, Germany with the goal to unite all Roma Ph.D. Students and young Roma scholars form Europe. 

Between 2018 - 2020 and 2021-2023 he was the Vice-President of the Gypsy Lore Society.

In 2020 he established the "Roma Research Center" at the University of Silesia, Katowice, Poland and  since then he serves as its Director. 

Prof. Dr. Hristo Kyuchukov established the International Journal of Romani Language and Culture and he was the editor of the Journal between 2011-2013.

Between 2014-2016, he studied Children and Youth Psychotherapy in Berlin, Germany and he works and does research in the field of Psychotherapy with migrant and refugee children and youth.

Editor
Currently, he is editor of the series "Roma" (with Ian Hancock),  "Interculturalism and intercultural education", "Lincom Studies in Language Acquisition and Bilingualism", "Turkish and Turkic Languages and Cultures" (with Suer Erker), and "Lincom Studies in Romani Linguistics" (with Milan Samko) published by LINCOM Academic Publisher in Germany.

He was also "proposed for Vice-Minister on Roma Educational Integration at the  Bulgarian Ministry of Education and Science".

Selected publications

Monographes 

 Kyuchukov, H. (2022) Bulgarian Roma and the Holocaust. Veliko Tarnovo: Faber
 Kyuchukov, H. (2020) Socio-cultural and linguistic aspects of Roma education. Katowice: University of Silesia Press.
 Artamonova, E., Kyuchukov, H. and Savchenko, E. (2017) Professional teacher training under current social and cultural conditions. Munich: Lincom Academic Publisher
 Kyuchukov, H. (2010) Esseys on the Language, Culture and Education of Roma. Uppsala: The Hugo Valentin Centre.
 Kyuchukov, H. (2007) Turkish and Roma children learning Bulgarian. V. Tarnovo: Faber.
 Kyuchukov, H. (2006) Desegregation of Roma schools in Bulgaria. Sofia: S.E.G.A.
 Kyuchukov, H. (2006) Educational status of Roma women. Sofia: Ictus.
 Kyuchukov, H. (1995) Romany children and their preparation for literacy.  A case study. Tilburg University Press.

Edited books 
 Kyuchukov, H., Marushiakova, E. and Popov, V.  (eds) (2020) Preserving the Romani memories. Munich: Lincom.
 Kyuchukov, H., Balvin, J. and Kwadrans, L. (eds) (2019) Life with Music and Pictures: Eva Davidova’s contribution to Roma Musicology and Ethnography. Munich: Lincom.
 Kyuchukov, H., Ushakova, O. and Yashina, V. (eds) (2019) Acquisition of Russian as L1 and L2. Munich: Lincom.
 Kyuchukov, H. and New, W. (eds.) (2017) Language of Resistance: Ian Hancock's contribution to Romani Studies. Munich: Lincom Academic Publisher.
 Kyuchukov, H. (ed.) (2016) New Trends in the Psychology of Language. Munich: Lincom Academic Publisher
 Kyuchukov, H., Marushiakova, E. and Popov, V. (eds.)(2016) Roma: Past, Present, Future. Munich:Lincom Academic Publisher
 Kyuchukov, H. (ed.) (2015) Acquisition of Slavic languages. Munich: Lincom Academic Publisher
 Kyuchukov, H., Kwadrans, L. and Fizik, L. (eds) (2015) Romani Studies: contemporary trends. Munich: Lincom Academic Publisher
 Kyuchukov, H., Lewowicki, T. and Ogrodzka-Mazur, E. (eds) (2015) Intercultural education: concepts, practice, problems. Munich: Lincom Academic Publisher.
 Kyuchukov, H., Kaleja, M.  and Samko, M. (eds) (2015) Linguistic, Cultural and Educational Issues of Roma. Munich: Lincom Academic Publisher.
 Selling, J., End, M., Kyuchukov, H., Laskar, P.  and Templer, B. (eds)  (2015). Antiziganism. What’s in a Word? Cambridge Scholars Publishing.
 Kyuchukov, H. and Rawashdeh, O. (eds) (2013) Roma Identity and Antigypsyism in Europe. Munich: Lincom Academic Publisher.
 Balvin, J., Kwadrans, L. and Kyuchukov, H. (eds) (2013) Roma in Visegrad Countries: History, Culture, Social Integration, Social work and Education. Wroclaw: Prom.
 Kyuchukov, H. and Artamonova, E. (eds) (2013) The educational and social sciences in the XXI century. Bratisalva: VSZaSV "Sv. Alzbeta".
 Kyuchukov, H. (ed) (2012) New Faces of Antigypsysm in Modern Europe. Prague: Slovo 21
 Stoyanova, J. and Kyuchukov, H. (eds.) (2011) Psichologiya i Lingvistika/Psychology and Linguistics. Sofia: Prosveta.
 Kyuchukov, H. and Hancock, I. (eds) (2010) Roma Identity.  Prague: Slovo 21.
 Kyuchukov, H. (ed.) (2009) A language without Borders… Endangered Languages and Cultures. Uppsala: Uppsala University Press, vol. 5.
 Kyuchukov, H. (ed.) (2002) New Aspects of Roma Children Education. Sofia: Diversity Publications.
 Bakker, P. and Kyuchukov, H. (eds)(2000) What is the Romani language? Hertfordshire: Hertfordshire University Press.
 Matras, Y., Bakker, P. and Kyuchukov, H. (eds) (1997) The typology and dialectology of Romani language. Amsterdam: John Benjamins Publishing Company.

Textbooks 

 Kyuchukov, H.  (2013)  Die Folklore der Gagausen aus Bulgarien. Muenchen: Lincom.
 Kyuchukov, H.  (2010) Textbook of Romani Songs. Muenchen: Lincom Europe.

Children's books 

 Kyuchukov, H and Giray, B.  (2022) Leo si tarsi topkata – Leo zucht sein Ball. V. Tarnovo: Faber
 Kyuchukov, H and Giray, B. (2022) Leo topuniu ariyor – Leo zucht sein Ball. V. Tarnovo: Faber 
 Kyuchukov, H. (2021) Zamfiran‘in hikayesi - E Zamfiraki historiya. Veliko Tarnovo: Faber/ Berlin: Amaro Foro
 Kyuchukov, H. (2021) Istoriyata na Zamfira - E Zamfiraki historiya. Veliko Tarnovo: Faber/ Berlin: Amaro Foro
 Kyuchukov, H. (2021) Die Geschichte von Zamfira - E Zamfiraki historiya. Veliko Tarnovo: Faber/ Berlin: Amaro Foro
 Kyuchukov, H. (2021) The Story of Zamfira - E Zamfiraki historiya. Veliko Tarnovo: Faber/ Berlin: Amaro Foro
 Kyuchukov, H. (2021) كان اسمى ح سين - Miro anav sas Hjusein. Veliko Tarnovo: Faber (in Arabic  and Romani)
 Kyuchukov, H. (2021) Benim adim Hyuseindi- Miro anav sas Hjusein. Veliko Tarnovo: Faber (in Turkish  and Romani)
 Kyuchukov, H. (2021) Az se kazvah Hyusein - Miro anav sas Hjusein. Veliko Tarnovo: Faber (in Bulgarian and Romani)
 Kyuchukov, H. (2020) Mein Name war Hüssein-Miro anav sas Hjusein. Veliko Tarnovo: Faber -Berlin Amaro Foro (in German and Romani )
 Kyuchukov, H. (2004) My name was Hussein. Honasdale: Boyds Mills Press
 Kyuchukov, H. and Hancock, I. (2005) A history of the Romani people. Honasdale: Boyds Mills Press.
 Kjučukov, Xristo (2002) Me ginav dži ko deš. Sofia: IKTUS, (in Romani).
 Kjučukov, Xristo. (2001) Amari Romani Lumya, 4 kotor, Romane lava phure Romendar. Sofia: Iktus, (in Romani).
 Kjučukov, Xristo (2001) Amari Romani Lumja. 3 kotor, Romane gilya.  Sofia: Iktus, (in Romani).
 Kjučukov, Xristo (2000) Amari Romani Lumja. 2 kotor, Romane paramisya. Sofia: Tilia, (in Romani).
 Kjučukov, Xristo (1997) Amari Romani Lumja. 1 kotor, Romane poeme. Sofia, (in Romani).

References 

1962 births
Living people
Linguists from Bulgaria
Linguists of Romani
Bulgarian educational theorists
Bulgarian people of Romani descent
University of Amsterdam alumni
People from Varna Province